York Force was a detachment of the Australian Army during the Second World War located on the Cape York Peninsula.

Commander
Brigadier John Wilson Crawford

Military history of Australia during World War II
Military units and formations of Australia in World War II